Paul Clayton East  (4 August 1946 – 27 February 2023) was a New Zealand politician of the National Party.

Early life and family
East was born in Ōpōtiki on 4 August 1946, and was educated at King's College, Auckland.  He studied at the University of Auckland, graduating with a Bachelor of Laws degree in 1970, and the University of Virginia, where he completed a Master of Laws degree in 1972.

In 1972, East married Marilyn Kottman, and the couple went on to have three children.

Prior to becoming an MP, East was a lawyer and barrister with East Brewster, a Rotorua-based legal firm, from 1973 to 1978. East also engaged in local politics as a member of the Rotorua City Council, which has now been subsumed into the Rotorua District Council.

Member of Parliament 

East was first elected to Parliament in the 1978 election as MP for Rotorua, and retained that seat until he became a list MP in the 1996 elections after losing a face-off for National's Rotorua nomination to Max Bradford.  In 1990, East was awarded the New Zealand 1990 Commemoration Medal.

East served in a number of ministerial roles, including those of Minister of Defence and Attorney-General in the fourth National government. When Jenny Shipley replaced Jim Bolger as leader of the National Party, East was one of the minority who remained aligned with Bolger.

East was appointed a member of the Privy Council in 1998. In 1999, he resigned from Parliament to take up the position of New Zealand High Commissioner to the United Kingdom in London. He was replaced in Parliament by Alec Neill, the next candidate on National's party list.

Attorney-general 
As attorney-general, East advocated on important international issues, including a case brought before the International Court of Justice in 1995 on behalf of New Zealand against France's nuclear testing in the Pacific Ocean. East also headed the development of an advisory opinion to the UN General Assembly on the legality of nuclear testing in 1995. East was awarded the status of Queen's Counsel (QC) while Attorney-General.

Outside Parliament

From 2002, East had been independent chairman of the Charity Gaming Association (CGA), which is the industry organisation for charitable trusts that operate electronic gaming machines ("pokies") to raise funds for community purposes.  In 2008 the CGA's members operated 75% of non-club gaming machines in New Zealand and generated $250 million worth of grants for worthwhile community purposes.

In the 2005 Queen's Birthday Honours, East was appointed a Companion of the New Zealand Order of Merit for services to Parliament and the law.

Death
East died in Auckland on 27 February 2023, at the age of 76. Fellow former National MP Chester Borrows also died the same day.

Notes

References

 1990 Parliamentary Candidates for the New Zealand National Party p. 68 by John Stringer (New Zealand National Party, 1990)

External links

 Charity Gaming Association (Inc)

|-

|-

1946 births
2023 deaths
People from Ōpōtiki
People educated at King's College, Auckland
University of Auckland alumni
University of Virginia School of Law alumni
20th-century New Zealand lawyers
People from Rotorua
New Zealand city councillors
Members of the New Zealand House of Representatives
New Zealand MPs for North Island electorates
New Zealand National Party MPs
Members of the Cabinet of New Zealand
Attorneys-General of New Zealand
New Zealand King's Counsel
Companions of the New Zealand Order of Merit
New Zealand defence ministers
New Zealand list MPs
New Zealand members of the Privy Council of the United Kingdom
High Commissioners of New Zealand to the United Kingdom
20th-century King's Counsel